Pyrgulopsis carinifera is a species of minute freshwater snails with an operculum, aquatic gastropod molluscs or micromolluscs in the family Hydrobiidae.

This species' natural habitat is springs.  It is endemic to springs in the Moapa Valley, southern Nevada, United States.

Description
Its differentiated from other Pyrgulopsis in that its penial filament has a medium, distally bifurcated lobe and medium length filament with the penial ornament consisting of a fragmented terminal gland.

Genus transfer
Pyrgulopsis carinifera was originally described as Fluminicola avernalis carinifera in 1935. In 1994, it was transferred to the genus Pyrgulopsis.

References

 

Molluscs of the United States
carinifera
Gastropods described in 2008